The 2021 Newfoundland and Labrador Tankard, the men's provincial curling championship for Newfoundland and Labrador, was held from January 27 to 31 at the RE/MAX Centre in St. John's, Newfoundland and Labrador. The winning Greg Smith rink represented Newfoundland and Labrador at the 2021 Tim Hortons Brier, Canada's national men's curling championship in Calgary, Alberta. The event was held in conjunction with the 2021 Newfoundland and Labrador Scotties Tournament of Hearts, the provincial women's championship.

The 2021 Tankard was one of the few provincial curling championships to be held in 2021 due to the COVID-19 pandemic in Canada. While most provincial championships were cancelled, both the Newfoundland and Labrador men's and women's provincials were given the green light by the provincial government and chief medial officer.

In the final, Greg Smith won his second tankard by defeating Colin Thomas 9–8 in a double extra end.

Teams
The teams are listed as follows:

Round Robin Standings
Final Round Robin Standings

Round Robin Results
All draws are listed in Newfoundland Time (UTC−03:30).

Draw 1
Wednesday, January 27, 2:00 pm

Draw 2
Wednesday, January 27, 7:00 pm

Draw 3
Thursday, January 28, 2:00 pm

Draw 4
Thursday, January 28, 7:00 pm

Draw 5
Friday, January 29, 2:00 pm

Draw 6
Friday, January 29, 7:00 pm

Draw 7
Saturday, January 30, 9:00 am

Note: Team Ryan forfeited the match.

Tiebreaker
Saturday, January 30, 2:30 pm

Playoffs

Semifinal
Saturday, January 30, 7:30 pm

Final
Sunday, January 31, 1:00 pm

References

External links

2021 Tim Hortons Brier
Tankard, 2021
Tankard, 2021
Tankard, 2021
January 2021 sports events in Canada